Vivekananda College, established in 1985, is general degree college in Alipurduar. It is in Alipurduar district. It offers undergraduate courses in arts. It is affiliated to  University of North Bengal.

About
The college was established in 1985 as a result of the hearty co-operation of the inhabitants of Alipurduar the vast and adjacent locality and the sincere efforts of strict supervision of Late Nani Bhattacharjee, the former M.L.A. Piyush Tirkey, former MP, Late Manojit Nag former vice-chairman of the Municipality of Alipurduar. First meeting for establishment of the college was convened by Late Sunil Kumar Bhowmik, former Principal Alipurduar College on 02/05/1985. It is exemplary that people belonging to different strata of the society donated money to raise funds for the establishment of the college. Initially the college land was donated by Sri Ramkrishna Ashram, Alipurduar Junction. Then a bigger land was donated by Sri. Surendra Nath Das & Sri. Manik Chandra Das of Birpara for additional college building and playground. One block of the college building is named after their father Late Sri Shrikanta Das. The foundation of the college is marked by the earnest desire of various eminent personalities and association to promote higher education in the locality. On 18 Nov. 1986 the foundation stone of the new college building was laid by Prof. Nirmal Bose, MIC, Higher Education, Industry & Commerce, Govt. of West Bengal. In the initial stage, Classes were held in a building of Sri. Durga Das Saha at Birpara Chowpathi, on 3 October 1985. Prof. Dipti Bhusan Dutta, Vice-Chancellor, North Bengal University inaugurated the ceremonial function of its opening day and Sri. Nani Bhattacharya, Hon’ble Minister of Irrigation & Water Ways graced the occasion as Chief Guest. Other dignified and Hon’ble Speakers on the occasion were Sri. Raghabendra Singh. IAS, Sub-Divisional Officer, Alipurduar, Dr. B.K. Bajpaie, Register of North Bengal University and Sri Jogendra Nath Sinha Roy, MLA. The college has succeeded in achieving several goals in its long 25 years span and is progressing with positive attitudes towards brighter future.

Departments

Arts
Bengali
English
History
Political Science
Philosophy
Education
Economics

Facilities

College Library: The college has library with more than 11,000 books on different subjects. Students are provided with readers card of the reading room for the library and a Borrowers card which enable them to take out books on loan. These cards are not transferable and must be returned in time. Attempts have been made for the computerization on the same.

Full free and Half free: A good number of half and full free studentships are awarded to students on the basis of academic results and financial conditions. No full free or half free studentship will be awarded to a student who enjoy SC/ST stipend or any other student scholarships, as per government rules.

Government Scholarship: Students belonging to Scheduled Castes and Scheduled Tribes are required to apply through the Principal for Stipends and Scholarships.

Railway Concessions: Students may obtain concession for railway journey to long-distance places if they apply through the Principal on grounds permissible in terms of the Indian Railways.

National Cadet Corps (NCC): All students, both boys & girls, are allowed to opt for enrolment in NCC, if selected by the concerned NCC officers.

National service scheme (NSS): Eligible students are allowed to get enlisted as NSS volunteers under NSS Programme office of the college for doing Social Works.

Accreditation
The college is recognized by the University Grants Commission (UGC).
The college applied for NAAC accreditation but failed to clear IIQA first time. Then in March, 2021 NAAC peer team visit was done but the college got D grade. That means non accreditation. This poor result has put the college in dark future.

See also

References

External links
vivekananda college alipurduar
University of North Bengal
University Grants Commission
National Assessment and Accreditation Council

Universities and colleges in Alipurduar district
Colleges affiliated to University of North Bengal
Educational institutions established in 1985
1985 establishments in West Bengal